is a Japanese actress, singer, and former member of the female idol group SDN48. Her hobby is reading. Her skills are writing, playing basketball, long-distance running, and cooking.

Akiko's twin sister is Natsuko.

Discography

Singles

Theatre performances

Publications

Videos

Filmography

TV drama

Variety series

Films

Stage

Advertisements

Others

Bibliography

Photobooks

References

External links
 

Ken-On artists
Japanese actresses
Japanese twins
1989 births
Living people
Actors from Chiba Prefecture